Alfred Tremblay (1887─1975) was a Canadian prospector, explorer and an officer of the Order of Canada.

In 1912 Tremblay was working as a prospector, when he joined an expedition led by J.E. Bernier to Pond Inlet, seeking gold.  In 1913 his guides lead him south, to Igloolik.  Tremblay published an account of this expedition in 1921.

References

1975 deaths
Date of death missing
Place of death missing
Year of birth missing
Place of birth missing
Canadian gold prospectors
Officers of the Order of Canada